Caroline Finkel is a British historian and writer based in Turkey; she has a doctorate in Ottoman history from the School of Oriental and African Studies, University of London.

Publications 
Her book Osman's Dream, History of the Ottoman Empire 1300-1923 was published by John Murray in England in 2005, and by Basic Books in the United States. A Greek translation appeared in 2007, Dutch in 2008, and Russian in 2010. The Turkish edition, Rüyadan İmparatorluğa: Osmanlı (2007) is in its fourth printing.

She has recently co-authored a guidebook of Turkey's first long-distance equestrian, hiking and biking route, the Evliya Çelebi Way. It is available in English and Turkish.

Other works include The administration of warfare: the Ottoman military campaigns in Hungary, 1593-1606 (1988), and The seismicity of Turkey and adjacent areas : a historical review, 1500-1800 (1995, also in Turkish), written with N. N. Ambraseys. She holds honorary fellowships at the University of Edinburgh in Scotland and the University of Exeter in England.

References 

Year of birth missing (living people)
British writers
British historians
Historians of Turkey
Scholars of Ottoman history
Historians of Europe
Living people
British military historians
British women historians